Mannan endo-1,4-beta-mannosidase (endo-1,4-beta-mannanase, endo-beta-1,4-mannase, beta-mannanase B, beta-1, 4-mannan 4-mannanohydrolase, endo-beta-mannanase, beta-D-mannanase, 1,4-beta-D-mannan  mannanohydrolase) is an enzyme with systematic name 4-beta-D-mannan mannanohydrolase. This enzyme catalyses the following chemical reaction

 Hydrolysis of (1->4)-beta-D-mannosidic linkages in mannans, galactomannans and glucomannans. This cleavage occurs at random internal sites within the chain, as denoted by the prefix "endo".

References

External links 
 

EC 3.2.1